Jonathan Alexander González Mendoza (born 13 April 1999) is a professional footballer who plays as a midfielder for Liga MX club Monterrey. Born in the United States, he represented the Mexico national team.

Club career

Monterrey
González signed for Mexican club C.F. Monterrey in 2014. He played for the youth teams until he was promoted to the first-team in 2017.

On 21 July 2017, González made his senior professional debut for Monterrey in their opening match of the 2017–18 season against Monarcas Morelia. Concluding at the first half of the season, he would go on to be included in the Ideal Eleven of Apertura 2017. At the end of the 2017–18 season, he was given the Rookie of the Year Award from Mexico's Balón de Oro.

On 7 August 2022, it was announced that González has signed on loan with Major League Soccer side Minnesota United for the remainder of the season.

International career

United States
Born in the United States to Mexican parents, González holds a U.S. and Mexican citizenship, which made him eligible to represent either the United States or Mexico. 
González represented the United States at several international youth levels ranging from the under-15 side to the under-20 side, including the under-17 side.

Mexico
In January 2018, he communicated his desire to represent Mexico at senior level. On 24 January 2018, González received his one-time switch from FIFA, clearing him to play for Mexico.
On 31 January 2018, González made his debut appearance for Mexico in a friendly against Bosnia and Herzegovina, coming in as a substitute for Elías Hernández at the 57th minute.

On 22 May 2018, he was called up to the under-21 side that participated at the 2018 Toulon Tournament in France. He started in all group stage matches and the semi-final but did not appear in the final — where Mexico lost 2–1 against England — due to an injury.

Despite having switched to the Mexico national football team, González did not receive a  call up to the 2018 FIFA World Cup.

González was blocked by his club Monterrey from joining the under-20 squad for the 2019 U-20 World Cup.

Style of play
González is described as "A technically proficient midfielder, who’s displayed a decent eye for a pass, Jonathan usually plays in a “number six” role as a deep-lying playmaker in a three-man midfield. However, he can use his talents in a more advanced midfield role, or as part of a double-pivot in a two-man midfield," and "[That] there's no petulance or talking back to the officials, but there is an aggressive (in a good way) and incessant motor looking to break up the opposition's play and distribute correctly when on the ball."

Personal life
Jonathan attended Montgomery High School in Santa Rosa, CA. from 2013-2017. His younger brother is Adrián González, who is currently part of the LA Galaxy academy.

Career statistics

Club

International

Honours
Monterrey
Liga MX: Apertura 2019
Copa MX: Apertura 2017
CONCACAF Champions League: 2019

United States U20
CONCACAF Under-20 Championship: 2017

Individual
Liga MX Best XI: Apertura 2017
Liga MX Best Rookie: 2017–18
CONCACAF Champions League Best Young Player: 2019

References

External links

1999 births
Living people
American sportspeople of Mexican descent
Sportspeople from Santa Rosa, California
Soccer players from California
Mexican footballers
American soccer players
Association football midfielders
C.F. Monterrey players
Liga MX players
United States men's youth international soccer players
United States men's under-20 international soccer players
Mexico under-20 international footballers
Mexico international footballers
American expatriate soccer players
American expatriate sportspeople in Mexico
Expatriate footballers in Mexico
Minnesota United FC players
Major League Soccer players